Cydia cognatana is a species of moth belonging to the family Tortricidae. The species was first described by Charles Golding Barrett in 1874.

It is native to Europe.

References

Grapholitini
Moths described in 1874